Clubhead Nonstopmegamix #1 is a 2004 megamix album by Pigface and Omegaman.

Track listing

2004 remix albums
Pigface albums
Music medleys